Sullivan City is a city in Hidalgo County, Texas. The population was 4,002 at the 2010 United States Census. It is part of the McAllen–Edinburg–Mission and Reynosa–McAllen metropolitan areas.

History
Sullivan City was named for Captain Ed Sullivan, a World War veteran, who owned a ranch. The town was formally opened in 1908. In 1911, the town was incorporated with Sam Hargrove as Mayor. William Jennings Bryan purchased land in the area in 1910, and he established a store and filling station.

Geography

Sullivan City is located at  (26.275087, –98.568330).

Demographics

2020 census

As of the 2020 United States census, there were 3,908 people, 1,254 households, and 964 families residing in the city.

2000 census
As of the census of 2000, there were 3,998 people, 981 households, and 909 families residing in the city. The population density was 1,117.1 people per square mile (431.2/km2). There were 1,136 housing units at an average density of 317.4 per square mile (122.5/km2). The racial makeup of the city was 64.96% White, 0.10% African American, 0.03% Native American, 34.09% from other races, and 0.83% from two or more races. Hispanic or Latino of any race were 98.65% of the population.

There were 981 households, out of which 60.2% had children under the age of 18 living with them, 74.0% were married couples living together, 14.5% had a female householder with no husband present, and 7.3% were non-families. 6.6% of all households were made up of individuals, and 3.4% had someone living alone who was 65 years of age or older. The average household size was 4.08 and the average family size was 4.29.

In the city, the population was spread out, with 38.5% under the age of 18, 12.9% from 18 to 24, 27.4% from 25 to 44, 16.1% from 45 to 64, and 5.1% who were 65 years of age or older. The median age was 24 years. For every 100 females, there were 96.2 males. For every 100 females age 18 and over, there were 94.5 males.

The median income for a household in the city was $17,743, and the median income for a family was $18,056. Males had a median income of $16,628 versus $12,670 for females. The per capita income for the city was $5,131. About 49.0% of families and 47.8% of the population were below the poverty line, including 52.2% of those under age 18 and 60.5% of those age 65 or over.

Education
Sullivan City is served by the La Joya Independent School District. Elementary schools that serve the city are Rosendo Benavides Elementary and Sam Fordyce Elementary School. The secondary schools serving the city are Lorenzo de Zavala Middle School, and La Joya High School.

In addition, South Texas Independent School District operates magnet schools that serve the community.

Areas to the west of Sullivan City are served by the Rio Grande City Consolidated Independent School District.

Government and infrastructure
The United States Postal Service operates the Sullivan City Post Office.

References

Cities in Hidalgo County, Texas
Cities in Texas